is a type of Japanese folk music genre.

The Japanese term , originally used in Buddhist folk music in Japan, simply means "melody".  Like the generic term ondo, bushi, the voiced form of fushi, is used as a suffix for Japanese folk songs.

It is found in many Japanese traditional and folk songs, usually shamisen or sanshin songs. Some examples include: Ringo bushi, Tsugaru yosare bushi, Tsugaru aiya bushi, Tsugaru jongara bushi, Hōnen bushi and Itokuri bushi. Yasaburō bushi is one of the most well known, and dates back over 300 years. These folk songs are most commonly heard at local festivals in Japan.

References

See also
 Tsugaru-jamisen
 Shamisen
 Ryukyuan music

Japanese folk music
Japanese styles of music